Bernice is an unincorporated community in Illinois Township, Pope County, Arkansas, United States. The area, located on Arkansas Highway 7 Truck, is now part of Russellville.

References

Unincorporated communities in Pope County, Arkansas
Unincorporated communities in Arkansas